is a Japanese television jidaigeki or period drama that was broadcast in 1987. It is the 29th in the Hissatsu series.

Cast
Masaomi Kondō as Karuta no Ayataro
Ken Tanaka as hayanawa no Seiji
Teruhiko Aoi as Sutasuta no Matsubouzu
Sayoko Ninomiya as Outa
Yuki Kudo as Oshichi

References

1987 Japanese television series debuts
1980s drama television series
Jidaigeki television series